This is a list of dental colleges in India.

Assam
 Dibrugarh Dental College
 Regional Dental College, Guwahati
 Government Dental College, Silchar

Karanataka
 Coorg Institute of Dental Sciences
 Goa Dental College, Bambolim
 Government Dental College, Bangalore
 JSS Dental College, Mysore
 Krishnadevaraya College of Dental Sciences and Hospital, Bangalore
 Manipal College of Dental Sciences, Manipal
 Manipal College of Dental Sciences, Mangalore
 Post Graduate Institute of Dental Sciences, Rohtak
 Rajarajeswari Dental college and Hospital
 Sri Dharmasthala Manjunatheshwara College of Dental Sciences

Manipur 
 RIMS Dental college, Imphal
 Jawaharlal Nehru Institute of Medical Sciences Dental College, Imphal

Uttar Pradesh
ITS Dental College, Greater Noida
 Faculty of Dentistry, King George's Medical University, Chowk, Lucknow
 College of Dentistry (only postgraduate), Uttar Pradesh University of Medical Sciences, Saifai
 Purvanchal Institute of Dental Sciences, GIDA, Gorakhpur

Other states or union territories 
 Baba Jaswant Singh Dental College, Hospital & Research Institute Ludhiana, Punjab
 ITS Dental College, Greater Noida, Delhi
 J.K.K.Nattraja Dental College & Hospital, Komarapalayam, Namakkal, Tamil Nadu
 New Horizon Dental College and Research Institute, Bilaspur, Chhattisgarh

References 

 
Dental schools
India